The Office of Local Defense Community Cooperation (OLDCC), formerly the Office of Economic Adjustment (OEA), is a United States Department of Defense (DoD) field activity and the DoD's primary source for assisting communities that are adversely impacted (e.g. loss of employment or contracting opportunities) by Defense program changes, including base closures or realignments, base expansions, and contract or program cancellations. To assist affected communities, OLDCC manages and directs the Defense Economic Adjustment Program and coordinates the involvement of other federal agencies.

History
Founded in 1961 under President John F. Kennedy and Defense Secretary Robert McNamara, the Office of Economic Adjustment (OEA), later the Office of Local Defense Community Cooperation (OLDCC), was tasked with mitigating the adverse impact on jobs and local economies after a government cost-reduction program closed several military bases. In the late-1960s and early-70s, OEA opened regional offices in major cities nationwide to facilitate federal grant deliveries.

In the 1980s, OEA phased out categorical grants (grants with specific categories upon which they can be spent) in favor of block grants (grants with few or no conditions on spending). Regional assistance waned and all offices not on the West Coast were shuttered. No major military bases were closed during the 1980s. In 1988, a new base closure statute was enacted, which was designed to shield the process from political manipulation (Pork barrel politics, i.e. congresspeople ensuring bases in their states or districts remain open for political gain). The law set up a bipartisan commission that channeled base recommendations to the president; approximately 100 bases were closed and 50 realigned. 

As a result of the Base Realignment and Closure (BRAC) process developed in the late-1980s and 1990s, OEA provided support to many local communities amidst defense industry cutbacks. OEA's success served as a model for communities within former Soviet States and new Eastern European countries to better cope with reductions in military spending brought about by the end of the Cold War and the dissolution of the Soviet Union.

The William M. (Mac) Thornberry National Defense Authorization Act for Fiscal Year 2021 (NDAA FY2021) included a provision (Section 905) that amended Chapter 4 of Title 10 of the United States Code to rename OEC the Office of Local Defense Community Cooperation (OLDCC). The provision took effect upon enactment of the Act on January 1, 2021.

In 2013, military operations partially subsided as a result of budget sequestration (spending cuts) imposed by the Budget Control Act of 2011, harming Defense Department-dependent states and communities. Seeking to avert similar economic slowdowns, OEA Director O'Brien began issuing the “Defense Spending by State” report to help state and local leaders cope with potential loss of Defense contracts through economic diversification or technological innovation and Defense Secretary Leon Panetta pledged continuing aid to affected communities.

Executive Order 14008, issued by President Joe Biden in early 2021, added addressing climate change to OLDCC's goals.

Operations
The Office of Local Defense Community Cooperation provides technical and financial assistance (referred to as economic adjustment assistance) to states and local communities supporting the mission of the Department of Defense. Such aid is intended to enhance the resiliency and readiness of defense installations and their surrounding communities.

Economic adjustment assistance provides a community-based context for assessing economic hardships caused by DoD program changes by identifying and evaluating alternative courses of action, identifying resource requirements, and assisting in the preparation of an adjustment strategy or action plan to help communities help themselves. Public and private partnerships are employed in areas such as public infrastructure to help local communities, the residents of which are often employed by or otherwise support military installations, and reduce operating costs.

OLDCC employees have a range of experience in economic and community development, land use planning, real estate redevelopment, federal real property programs, military programs, and worker adjustment. Project managers also bring a working knowledge of other federal agencies and their respective programs to help communities put together an adjustment program combining federal, state, local, and private resources.

OLDCC also administers a Joint Land Use Study (JLUS) program to encourage cooperative land use planning between military installations and the surrounding communities where civilian encroachment is likely to impair the operations of an installation. In these instances, the Office may provide technical and financial assistance to state and local governments to achieve compatible land use and development activities near Department facilities. A JLUS is funded by an OLDCC grant and contributions from the local government (the "JLUS sponsor"); such studies seek to balance military installation and local community needs by increasing stakeholder communication and joint planning to ensure compatibility.

Programs
OLDCC operates six "programs of assistance" aimed at helping local Defense-supporting communities: 

 Community Investment Program: Funds public services (e.g. infrastructure, utilities, schools, medical care) for Department personnel and their families. Further divided into four program lines: 
 Mission Growth: Supplies grants to state and local governments to finance adjustments in public services and infrastructure in response to base establishments or expansions.
 Public Schools on Military Installations (PSMI): Funds construction, renovation, repair, and expansion of public schools located on military bases. Despite their location, these schools are operated by local authorities.
 Transportation Infrastructure Improvements Associated with Medical Facilities: Funds improvements in accessibility of military medical centers at expanding installations. 
 Civilian Infrastructure on the Territory of Guam: Funds public water and wastewater treatment infrastructure and historic preservation efforts on Guam, an  American territory closely tied to the military.
 Downsizing Program: After base closures or reductions, deploys project managers to select local redevelopment authorities (LRAs) to represent community members to local, state, and federal agencies. The project manager and LRA develop plans to revitalize the local economy, seek private and public investment, and support affected workers and businesses.
 Industry Resilience Program: Alongside state and local partners, helps defense manufacturers diversify products, attract investment, and develop new technologies. Additionally, enhances defense-industrial company resilience and potency through cybersecurity, modernization, and worker training assistance.
 Military Installation Sustainability Program: Funds state and local government improvement of installation sustainability (i.e. resilience against natural disasters or adverse environmental changes such as climate change and pollution). Delivers grants to states, private landowners, and others and drafts plans and provides assistance in finding solutions to light pollution, urban sprawl, endangered species management, energy security threats, etc.
 Defense Community Infrastructure Program (DCIP): Funds community infrastructure to support Defense personnel and families.
 Defense Manufacturing Community Support Program (DMCSP): Supports long-term community investments in national security innovation and defense manufacturing industrial ecosystem capability expansion (i.e. funding research and development in defense-critical technologies).

Selected activities
Below is an incomplete listing of projects funded by OLDCC. When known, the specific program behind the funding is given. 

In September 2020, DMCSP awarded a $3.7 million grant to the University of Alabama in Huntsville to fund aviation, missile, and ground vehicle modernization in the Alabama Defense Advanced Manufacturing Community (a group of 22 counties and major military areas such as Redstone Arsenal).

Also in September 2020, DCIP awarded a $1.4 million grant to the city of Sierra Vista, Arizona to construct an emergency medical services substation serving Fort Huachuca military members.

In June 2021, OLDCC provided 80% (roughly $24.4 million) of the $30.5 million construction costs of a new elementary school in Fort Riley, Kansas.

In July 2021, the Industry Resilience Program provided $1.5 million to the state of Virginia, with $1.026 million going to the GENEDGE Alliance (a Virginia manufacturing development organization) to help at least 85 small defense companies afford compliance with Defense Department cybersecurity standards and $474,000 going to the Old Dominion University-run Maritime Industrial Base Ecosystem (MIBE) initiative, which seeks to modernize and sustain maritime training pipelines to support the shipbuilding and ship repair workforces.

In February 2021, OLDCC funding allowed the Hawaii Department of Business, Economic Development and Tourism to conduct a study of its defense industry (much like Guam, Hawaii's Pacific location makes it strategically important and military-tied). State officials were able to move towards developing a new agency to attract local businesses to defense contracts, using military funds to diversify the Hawaiian economy, and planning ahead in the event of a defense spending decrease.

Organization
OLDCC is a Department of Defense field activity under the Office of the Secretary of Defense (OSD); more specifically, it is under the purview of the Office of the Under Secretary of Defense for Acquisition and Sustainment (OUSD(A&S)). The Under Secretary also appoints the director of OLDCC.

While headquartered in Arlington, Virginia, OLDCC retains a Western Regional Office in Sacramento, California headed by Deputy Director, Western Regional Office/Program Manager Gary Kuwabara.

Director
The director of OLDCC is, by statute, appointed by the Under Secretary of Defense for Acquisition and Sustainment and must be a federal civilian employee or private individual with "experience in the interagency in the Executive Branch [and] experience in the administration and management of Federal grants programs." He or she is charged with operating the Office and ensuring appropriate aid is sent to Defense-supporting communities. The director serves ex officio as Executive Director of the Economic Adjustment Committee, a body composed of various federal department heads and other agency leaders or their representatives that coordinates interagency economic assistance in response to Defense program changes.

The current director is Patrick O'Brien, an economic development expert and former HUD employee.

Programs and director subordinates
The various subordinates of the director of OLDCC head various programs and internal subdivisions of the office. Below is a list of subgroups/programs and their respective leaders:

 Community Investment Program - Program Director, Community Investment; currently (as of August 2021) Sigmund "Sig" Csicsery
 Downsizing Program - Deputy Program Director, BRAC & Downsizing; currently Elizabeth "Liz" Chimienti
 Industry Resilience Program - Program Director, Industry Resilience; currently Michael Gilroy
 Military Installation Sustainability Program - Program Director, Military Installation Sustainability; currently David R. Kennedy
 Defense Community Infrastructure Program (DCIP) - Unknown
 Defense Manufacturing Community Support Program (DMCSP) - Unknown

Below is a list of senior offices not directly affiliated with the above six programs:

 Deputy Director for Integration, currently Doug Brown
 Deputy Director for Programs, currently Daniel Glasson
 Deputy Director for Compliance, currently James P. Holland
 Program Director for Intergovernmental Affairs, currently Tara Butler
 Deputy Director, Western Regional Office/Program Manager, currently Gary Kuwabara
 Associate Director, currently William Van Houten

Economic Assistance Committee
The Economic Adjustment Committee (EAC) is a body composed of various federal department heads and other agency leaders (or their designees) that coordinates interagency economic assistance in response to Defense program changes. It is not a part of OLDCC, but works closely with the Office. With a membership similar to but greater than that of a typical presidential cabinet, the EAC's current roster of 22 is as follows:

 Secretary of Agriculture
 Attorney General (head of the Department of Justice)
 Secretary of Commerce
 Secretary of Defense
 Secretary of Education
 Secretary of Energy
 Secretary of Health and Human Services
 Secretary of Housing and Urban Development
 Secretary of the Interior
 Secretary of Labor
 Secretary of State
 Secretary of Transportation
 Secretary of the Treasury
 Secretary of Veterans Affairs
 Secretary of Homeland Security
 Chairman of the Council of Economic Advisers
 Director of the Office of Management and Budget (OMB)
 Director of the Office of Personnel Management (OPM)
 Administrator of the Environmental Protection Agency (EPA)
 Administrator of the General Services Administration (GSA)
 Administrator of the Small Business Administration (SBA)
 Postmaster General (head of USPS)

Additionally, the Director of the Office of the Local Defense Community Cooperation serves as the EAC's Executive Director

References

External links
 

United States Department of Defense agencies